"Lasso the Moon" is a song written by Steve Dorff and Milton Brown, and recorded by American country music artist Gary Morris. The song was released in May 1985 and was featured on the soundtrack to the comedy-western film Rustlers' Rhapsody.  The song reached number 9 on the Billboard Hot Country Singles chart.

Chart performance

References

1985 singles
Gary Morris songs
Songs written by Steve Dorff
Song recordings produced by Jim Ed Norman
Warner Records singles
1985 songs
Songs about the Moon